This is a list of notable members of the Yadav community.

Religion 
 Swami Ramdev, born Ram Krishna Yadav.
 Mahant Balaknath, MP from Alwar , Rajsthan.

Freedom fighters 
 Maveeran Alagumuthu Kone - Freedom fighter, known for his revolt against British.
 Rao Tula Ram He was one of the key leaders of the Indian rebellion of 1857 in Haryana, where he is considered a state hero.
 Chaudhary Brahm Prakash Yadav. Was CM of Delhi.
 Roop Nath Singh Yadav

Academicians 
 K. C. Yadav

Civil servants and bureaucrats 
 Vinod Kumar Yadav, Former Chairperson of the Railway Board, First Chief Executive Officer, Railway Board, Indian Railways and the ex-officio Principal Secretary to the Government of India.
 Santosh Kumar Yadav, IAS, Chairperson of NHAI
 Bhupendra Yadav, IPS, former DGP of Rajasthan Police, chairman, Rajasthan Public Service Commission.
 Gaurav Yadav, DGP of Punjab Police
 Jagmohan Yadav, IPS, Former DGP of Uttar Pradesh Police.
 Manoj Yadava, IPS, DGP of Haryana Police.
 Navniet Sekera, IPS, Additional director general of police, Uttar Pradesh Police.
 Dinesh Kumar Yadav, IPS, Inspector General of Police Himachal Pradesh
 Neera Yadav, IAS, Former Chief Secretary Of Uttar Pradesh.
 Pranjal Yadav, IAS.
 V.S. Yadav, IPS, DGP of Tripura Police.

Judiciary 
 Sanjay Yadav, Former Chief Justice of Allahabad High Court.
 Shekhar Kumar Yadav.
 Surendra Kumar Yadav

Film and television 
 Akash Singh Yadav
 Baba Yadav.
 Dinesh Lal Yadav.
 Dwij Yadav.
 Khesari Lal Yadav.
 Kunal Singh Yadav
 Leena Yadav.
 Manisha Yadav.
 Narsing Yadav.
 Neha Yadav.
 Parul Yadav.
 Pragya Yadav.
 Rajkummar Rao
 Rajesh Yadav.
 Raghubir Yadav
 Rajpal Yadav.
 Ravi Yadav.
 Shrikant Yadav.
 Shyam Yadav.

Folk singers 
 Hiralal Yadav
 Baleshwar Yadav
 Bihari Lal Yadav, Father of folk genre Birha and invented Khartal Instrument which is used in Folk songs

First in their fields 
 Santosh Yadav, first woman in the world to climb Mount Everest twice, and the first woman to successfully climb Mt. Everest from Kangshung Face.
 Dr.Raj Vir Singh Yadav, performed the first kidney transplant in India at the Post Graduate Institute of Medical Education & Research (PGIMER) at Chandigarh in 1973. He was the first transplant surgeon to be by honoured by Indira Gandhi
 Surekha Yadav, India's first female train driver(Loco Pilot).
 Dr.Bhakti Yadav, The first female MBBS from Indore, India.
 Ram Baran Yadav, The first president of Nepal.
 Vinod Kumar Yadav, First Chief Executive Officer, Railway Board, Indian Railways and the ex-officio Principal Secretary to the Government of India.
 Chaudhary Brahm Prakash Yadav, First Chief Minister of Delhi.
 Ram Saroj Yadav, first Deputy Chief Minister of Madhesh Province, Nepal

Indian politics 
 Akhilesh Yadav, Ex-Chief Minister of Uttar Pradesh.
 Ajay Singh Yadav, former Union Minister.
 Ajesh Yadav, AAP member for Badli in the Sixth Legislative Assembly of Delhi.
 Akshay Yadav, M.P. in the 16th Lok Sabha.
 Annpurna Devi, Union Minister of state,
 Anand Sen Yadav, BSP politician.
 Anil Kumar Yadav, a politician from Bihar.
 Anil Kumar Yadav, Minister of Irrigation(Water Resources) Government of Andhra Pradesh.
 Anita Yadav, politician, Former Minister Haryana Congress.
 Anjan Kumar Yadav, former M.P. for Secunderabad.
 Arun Subhashchandra Yadav, former Union Minister.
 Arvind Singh Yadav, MLA, Chhibramau, SP.
 Annapurna Devi Yadav, Union Minister of State for Education.
 Ashok Kumar Yadav, Member of Parliament from Madhubani.
 Awadh Bihari Choudhary, Member of Bihar Legislative Assembly
 Babulal Gaur, Former Chief Minister of Madhya Pradesh
 Babulal Gaur Yadav, 16th Chief Minister of Madhya Pradesh(BJP).
 Badulgula Lingaiah Yadav, Member of the Parliament and leader Telangana Rashtra Samithi party.
 Balram Yadav, Samajwadi Party leader, UP.
 Balram Singh Yadav, former Union Minister
 Bhupender Yadav, Union Minister of Labour and Employment.
 Bhagabat Behera Yadav, former Cabinet Minister of Government of Odisha.
 Chandrajit Yadav, former Union Minister Ministry of Mines (India) & Ministry of Steel
 Chandrapal Singh Yadav, MP, Jhansi, SP.
 Chaudhary Brahm Prakash Yadav, former Chief Minister of Delhi.
 Chaudhary Harmohan Singh Yadav, SP Politician, Shaurya Chakra awardee.
 Daroga Prasad Rai, 10th Chief Minister of Bihar.
 Darshan Singh Yadav, former Rajya Sabha MP of Uttar Pradesh.
 Deo Narayan Yadav, Former Speaker of Bihar Legislative Assembly
 Dinesh Chandra Yadav, former Minister of Bihar and Member of Parliament.
 Dinesh Yadav, former member of Bihar Legislative Assembly.
 Deo Narayan Yadav, 12th Speaker of Bihar Legislative Assembly.
 Devender Yadav, Indian National Congress.
 Devendra Prasad Yadav, former RJD Leader.
 Devendra Singh Yadav, former M.P. for Etah.
 Dharmananda Behera Yadav, former MLA of Choudwar-Cuttack (Odisha).
 Dharmendra Yadav, M.P., Samajwadi Party.
 Dimple Yadav, M.P. for Kannauj.
 D. P. Yadav, leader of Rashtriya Parivartan Dal.
 Girish Yadav, State Minister, Uttar Pradesh, A BJP Leader.
 Hitesh Kumar Bagartti, former Member of Odisha Legislative Assembly(BJP).
 Hukmdev Narayan Yadav, former Union Minister of State.
 Hemchand Yadav, Former Cabinet Minister of Chhattishgarh Government.
 Jagadambi Prasad Yadav, former Minister of State in PM Morarji Desai Ministry
 Jaswant Singh Yadav, BJP, Rajasthan.
 Jay Prakash Narayan Yadav, former Union Minister of State for Water Resources.
 Kailash Nath Singh Yadav, Bahujan Samaj Party, Uttar Pradesh.
 Kanti Singh Yadav, former Union Minister.
 Krishna Gaur , MLA from Madhya Pradesh
 Lalita Yadav, Minister of State of Madhya Pradesh Government.
 Laloo Prasad Yadav, former Union Cabinet Minister of India, former Chief Minister of Bihar.
 Laxmi Narayan Yadav, M.P., Sagar, Madhya Pradesh.
 Mulayam Singh Yadav, former Union Defence Minister of India and Ex-Chief Minister of Uttar Pradesh.
 Madhusudan Yadav, former Lok Sabha MP and Mayor of Rajnandgaon Municipal Corporation.
 Mahinder Yadav, MLA, AAP.
 Manoj Yadav, former MLA of Bihar and MLA of Jharkhand.
 Mandakini Behera Yadav, former MLA of Odisha Nayagarh.
 Mitrasen Yadav, Communist Party leader.
 Mulayam Singh Yadav (Auraiya politician), former Member of Uttar Pradesh Legislative Council (MLC) for 3 times(he is not the father of Akhilesh Yadav).
 Mousadhi Bag Yadav, member of Odisha Legislative Assembly from Dharmagarh.
 Nityanand Rai, Union Minister of state for Home Affairs, BJP's Yadav face in Bihar Politics
 Nagendra Singh Munna Yadav, M.L.A., Samajwadi Party, Pratapgarh, Uttar Pradesh.
 Nand Kishore Yadav, Member of the Parliament of India representing Uttar Pradesh in the Rajya Sabha.
 Neera Yadav (politician), leader of Bharatiya Janata Party and the minister in government of Jharkhand.
 Nityanand Rai Yadav, Minister of State for Home Affairs.
 Om Prakash Yadav JDU, Bihar.
 Pappu Yadav, former RJD M.P.
 Poonamben Maadam, BJP M.P. from Jamnagar
 Pradeep Yadav, 13th Lok Sabha MP and MLA of Jharkhand state.
 Pramila Giri Yadav, former Member of Odisha Legislative Assembly from Baisinga (Mayurbhanj).
 Ram Harakh Yadav, Former Member of Parliament from Azamgarh (Lok Sabha constituency)
 Ramakant Yadav, BJP.
 Ram Krishna Yadav, former Member of Parliament from Azamgarh (Lok Sabha constituency)
 Ramesh Prasad Yadav, former Member of Bihar Legislative Assembly.
 Rampal Yadav, SP leader.
 Ram Gopal Yadav, Rajya Sabha member.
 Ram Kripal Yadav, former Union Minister of State.
 Ram Lakhan Singh Yadav, former member of Lok Sabha and Ex-MLA of Bihar.
 Ram Naresh Yadav, former Chief Minister of Uttar Pradesh, Former Governor of Madhya Pradesh, Former Governor of Chhattisgarh.
 Ranjan Prasad Yadav, RJD politician, Bihar.
 Rao Birender Singh, Former Chief Minister of Haryana
 Rekha Yadav, Bharatiya Janshakti Party Malhara (Vidhan Sabha constituency) in Chhatarpur district, Madhya Pradesh.
 Roop Nath Singh Yadav, politician and freedom fighter
 Sadhu Yadav, politician, Bihar.
 Sharad Yadav, leader of Janata Dal (U).
 Shivpal Singh Yadav, former Cabinat Minister of Uttar Pradesh.
 Shyamlal Yadav, Leader of Congress (I), Former Deputy Chairman of the Rajya Sabha.
 Subhash Yadav, former Deputy Chief Minister of Madhya Pradesh.
 Subhash Prasad Yadav, former Member of Parliament (Rajya Sabha) from Bihar.
 Sudha Yadav, BJP leader.
 Sunil Kumar Singh Yadav, Bahujan Samaj Party, Uttar Pradesh.
 Surendra Prasad Yadav, former Industrial Minister of Bihar & Jharkhand and Ex-MLA of Bihar he also served as an MP of 12th Lok Sabha.
 Talasani Srinivas Yadav, Minister of State in Government of Telangana(Telangana Rashtra Samithi).
 Tejashwi Yadav, Deputy Chief Minister of Bihar State.
 Tej Pratap Yadav, Ex-Minister for Health, Bihar.
 Tej Pratap Singh Yadav, M.P. for Mainpuri.
 Uma Kant Yadav, Bihar Legislative Assembly.
 Umlesh Yadav, former MLA for Bisauli Uttar Pradesh.
 Vijama Yadav, MLA, Pratappur, Prayagraj 
 Vijay Bahadur Yadav, MLA, Gorakhpur Rural.
 Yogendra Yadav, Leader of Swaraj Abhiyan.

Literature 
 Anand Yadav, a Marathi-language writer.
 J. N. Singh Yadav, English- and Hindi-language writer.
 Kulpreet Yadav
 Lalai Singh Yadav, writer and playwright from UP
 Rajendra Yadav, a pioneer of the Hindi literary movement known as Nayi Kahani.
 Ramashankar Yadav, Hindi poet.
 Sanjay Singh Yadav The Invasion of Delhi, Portraits of India
 K. C. Yadav , Indian Historian (1936-2021).
 Mannu Bhandari, Indian Writer.

Military 
 Captain Yogendra Singh Yadav, Param Veer Chakra.
 Commodore Babru Bhan Yadav, Maha Vir Chakra, Leading Indian Navy officer In Operation Trident operation of the Indian Navy that attacked Karachi, Pakistan. in the Indo-Pakistani War of 1971.
 Brigadier Rai Singh Yadav, Maha Vir Chakra, Hero of Nathu La and Cho La clashes.
 Parachute Commando Kaushal Yadav, Vir Chakra.
 Kulbhushan Yadav, Retired Indian Navy Officer.
 Corporal Jyoti Prakash Nirala, Ashok Chakra.
 Sujjan Singh (soldier), Ashok Chakra.
 Captain Umrao Singh, Victoria Cross Winner in Second World War.
 Kaushal Yadav
 Lt. Gen. J.B.S.Yadava, Former Deputy Chief of the Army Staff

Nepali politics 
 Bijay Kumar Yadav
 Bodhmaya Kumari Yadav, Member of Parliament
 Chitra Lekha Yadav, former minister for Education.
 Dinesh Chandra Yadav (Nepal) member of the Second Nepalese Constituent Assembly.
 Ganga Prasad Yadav, Governor of Sudurpashchim Province.
 Gita Kumari Yadav
 Mahendra Yadav, former Union Minister for Water Supply, Leader of Nepali Congress
 Mina Yadav, Member of Parliament, Leader of CPN Maoist (Centere)
 Mukta Kumari Yadav, Member of Parliament
 Pradeep Yadav, Union Minister for Forests and Environment
 Ram Saroj Yadav, first Deputy Chief Minister of Madhesh Province
 Radhe Chandra Yadav, member of the Second Nepalese Constituent Assembly.
 Ram Ayodhya Prasad Yadav, member of the Second Nepalese Constituent Assembly.
 Ram Sahaya Yadav, Vice President of Nepall
 Dr.Ram Baran Yadav, First President of Nepal.
 Rekha Yadav Thapa,Member of Parliament
 Renu Kumari Yadav, Minister of Education. member of the Madhesi Janadhikar Forum.
 Matrika Yadav, Ministry of Industry, Commerce and Supplies, A Nepal Communist Party Leader.
 Saroj Kumar Yadav, Chief Minister of Madhesh Province
 Sita Devi Yadav, Member of Parliament, National Treasurer of Nepali Congress
 Upendra Yadav, chairperson, People's Socialist Party, Nepal, Federal Socialist Forum, Nepal House Leader in Pratinidhi Sabha, Former External Affairs Minister of Nepal Government, Former Deputy Prime Minister of Nepal.

Professionals 
 Dr. Bhakti Yadav, Padma Shri awardee gynaecologist.
 Goriparthi Narasimha Raju Yadav, Leading Agriculturist, Padma Shri Awardee.
 Ramakant Yadav is a professor of neurology.
 Raj Vir Singh Yadav, Kidney transplant surgeon, Padma Shri Awardee, 1982
 Rahul Yadav, Ex CEO, Housing.com and founder of Intelligent Interfaces for e-commerce.
 Yogendra Yadav, Psephology.
 Jhillu Singh Yadav.

Science and technology 
 Jhillu Singh Yadav.
 Rajpal Singh Yadav.

Social workers 
 Phoolbasan Bai Yadav Social Worker in Chhattisgarh, Padma Shri Awardee, Godfrey Phillips National Bravery Awardee.

Sports 
 Virender Singh Yadav, Wrestling.
 Abhishek Yadav, football.
 Abhishek Yadav, table-tennis.
 Ajay Yadav, cricket.
 Akash Yadav, cricket.
 Amit Raj Kumar Yadav, cricket.
 Arjun Yadav, cricket.
 Ashwin Yadav, cricket.
 Avinash Yadav, cricket.
 Bani Yadav, Car rallyist, India's fastest women car racer.
 C. Rohit Yadav, Badminton
 Chinki Yadav, Indian sport shooter.
 Dharmendra Singh Yadav, boxing.
 Guru Hanuman aka Vijay Pal Yadav, Wrestling Coach
 Hemulal Yadav, cricket.
 Jai Prakash Yadav, cricket.
 Jayant Yadav, cricket.
 Jyoti Yadav, cricket.
 Kapil Yadav, cricket.
 Kavita Yadav, air-rifle Shooting.
 Krishnappa Gowtham, cricket
 Kuldeep Yadav, cricket.
 Kuldip Yadav, cricket.
 Lalit Yadav, Delhi cricketer.
 Lalit Yadav, Vidharbha cricketer.
 Laxmi Yadav, Cricket Women IPL.
 Mayank Yadav, cricket.
 Narsingh Pancham Yadav, wrestling.
 Poonam Yadav, cricket.
 Punam Yadav, weightlifting.
 Puneet Yadav, Cricket.
 Radha Yadav, Cricket.
 Rahul Yadav (cricketer).
 Rahul Yadav Chittaboina, Badminton.
 Rakesh Kumar Yadav, athletics.
 Ram Singh Sanjay Yadav, Cricket.
 Ram Singh Yadav, Marathon Runner.
 Renuka Yadav, hockey.
 C. Rohit Yadav, Badminton.
 Sandeep Tulsi Yadav, wrestling.
 Sanjay Yadav, cricket.
 Sanju Yadav, Footballer.
 Santosh Yadav (cricketer), cricket.
 Santosh Yadav, mountaineering.
 Satish Kumar Yadav, boxing.
 Sat Prakash Yadav, Basketball.
 Shivlal Yadav, cricket.
 Sonam Yadav, Cricket Women IPL.
 Suryakumar Yadav, cricket.
 Swapnali Yadav, swimming.
 Tejashwi Yadav, cricket.
 Umesh Yadav, cricket.
 Vidhya Yadav, cricket admintration.
 Vijay Yadav, cricket.
 Vikas Krishan Yadav, boxing.
 Vishal Yadav, cricket.

Criminals 
 Arun Gawli.
 Chavviram Singh Yadav.

Vice Chancellors 
 G. D. Yadav, Vice-Chancellor of Institute of Chemical Technology, Mumbai (erstwhile UDCT) from 2009 until November 2019.
 Ramesh Kumar Yadava, Vice Chancellor of Baba Mast Nath University, Rohtak, Haryana.
 Professor (Dr.) Raja Ram Yadav former vice-chancellor of Veer Bahadur Singh Purvanchal University.
 Professor (Dr.) Ramakant Yadav (neurologist) Vice-Chancellor, Uttar Pradesh University of Medical Sciences.
 Prof. Sushma Yadav , Vice-Chancellor, Central University of Haryana.
 Prof. J. P. Yadav, Vice-Chancellor, Indira Gandhi University,  Rewari, Haryana.

See also

References 

Lists of Indian people by community